Triaenostreptus is a genus of giant African millipedes in family Spirostreptidae, containing eight species:
 Triaenostreptus benedictus (Kraus, 1958)
 Triaenostreptus kruegeri (Attems, 1928)
 Triaenostreptus kymatorhabdus (Attems, 1914)
 Triaenostreptus lawrencei (Hoffman, 1971)
 Triaenostreptus lykophorus (Attems, 1934)
 Triaenostreptus robustus (Attems, 1935)
 Triaenostreptus tripartitus (Cook & Collins, 1893)
 Triaenostreptus unciger (Attems, 1928)

References

Spirostreptida
Millipedes of Africa